Kaimri is a village in Hisar tehsil and district in the Indian state of Haryana.

History 
According to the data maintained by the Government of India's Department of Statistics, the Govt Primary School Kaimri was established in 1943, which was upgraded to a high school in 1967 and to senior secondary school in 1997.

Occupation 
Main occupation of people is agriculture and government/private jobs. Some villagers are employed in government services and many people are doing private jobs.

Transport 
Kaimri is connected to nearby villages through the road network with presence of State Transport Service and Private Bus Services which link it to Amardeep colony and beyond to Hisar.

Geography 
Kaimri is located at Hisar-Kaimri road.

Demographics

Demographics as per 2001 census
 India Census, Kaimri had a population of 7204. Male population is 3853, while female population is 3351.

Demographics as per 2011 census
As of 2011 India census, Kaimri had a population of 8399 in 1584 households. Males (4443) constitute 52.89%  of the population and females (3956) 47.1%. Kaimri has an average literacy (4968) rate of 59.14%, more than the national average of 74%: male literacy (3018) is 60.74%, and female literacy (1950) is 39.25%. In Kaimri, 11.31% of the population is under 6 years of age (950).

Facilities
Kaimri village has government school, dispensary, etc. It is also the home of Shri Krishan Pranami Bal Sewa Ashram, Kaimri charitable orphanage and free school.
It also contain a Sankatmochan Kaimridham balaji mandir where peoples come from different cities of India.

See also

 Kaimri (disambiguation)
 Bidhwan
 Dhillon 
 Hansi City and Tehsil
 Haryana
 Hissar
 Hisar division
 Hisar (Lok Sabha constituency)
 Hisar Urban Agglomeration
 India
 Jat
 Siwani
 Tosham

References 

Villages in Hisar district